Dariusz Bayer (born 17 September 1964 in Poland) is a Polish retired footballer.

References

Polish footballers
Association football midfielders
Living people
Association football defenders
1964 births
Sportspeople from Białystok
ŁKS Łódź players
Jagiellonia Białystok players
Lech Poznań players
US Orléans players
Valenciennes FC players
FC Annecy players
Legia Warsaw players
20th-century Polish people